The online music magazine Pitchfork Media began awarding songs Best New Track (BNT) in its track reviews in 2009 as part of its Best New Music section. A total of 98 tracks, which the source reviewed album-only cuts, singles, remixes, a-sides and b-sides of singles and so forth, were given the title in its first year. All BNTs have a rating of 8/10 or higher, although not all tracks awarded 8/10 were titled BNT. Only two tracks were awarded a perfect 10/10 score in 2009: "While You Wait for the Others" (Grizzly Bear) and "What Would I Want? Sky" (Animal Collective). This list does not contain tracks that were included on Pitchforks best-of-year lists but did not receive BNT.

References

Lists of songs